Versailles Group plc was a FTSE-250, London-based trade finance company that was engaged in mezzanine lending  and gap finance.  The legal form of each of these transactions was that Versailles bought and sold goods and raw materials, the substance of the transactions was that Versailles financed its clients’ purchases of raw materials and subsequent sales of goods.   Versailles was listed on Alternative Investment Market in September 1995 and transferred to the main London Stock Exchange in October 1997.  In December 1999, trading in Versailles shares was suspended and in early 2000, the company was placed in administrative receivership.

Versailles Group plc should be distinguished from Versailles Group, Ltd. (http://versaillesgroup.com), which is a Boston-based, boutique M&A firm that was founded in 1987 by Mr. Donald Grava (https://www.linkedin.com/in/donaldgrava).  Specifically, Versailles Group Ltd. is a boutique investment bank that specializes in mergers, acquisitions, divestitures, private placements, and Fairness Opinions.

Versailles Group Ltd. was never affiliated with the now bankrupt Versailles Group plc.

History
Versailles Group plc was incorporated in 1990, providing trade finance primarily to businesses with poor credit history. The rates of interest charged were high: approximately 21% per annum with additional administration fees of 2.5% - 3.5% of the invoices’ value.  Versailles grew rapidly: revenue increased from £46.6 million in 1995 to £232.4 million in 1999; operating profit rose from £2.8 million to £15.3 million over the same period. The share price jumped from 7.5p on flotation in 1995 to £2.50 in September 1999, representing a £600m market capitalization and 140% CAGR in share appreciation.  In January 2000, the Serious Fraud Office investigated Versailles and its management following its financial collapse in which it owed its banks, led by Barclays and Royal Bank of Scotland, more than £70m.  The investigation focused on a £100m discrepancy in Versailles’s accounts, fictitious trades, forged documents, monies circulated to give the appearance of financial activity, and the alteration of computer records.

Fraud
Carlton Cushnie, Versailles’s then Chairman and Chief Executive, and Frederick Clough, the Finance Director, surrendered themselves to the Metropolitan Police Fraud Squad to face charges of Fraudulent Trading contrary to Section 458 of the Companies Act 1985. Frederick Clough's personal assistant, Lorraine Jones, was additionally charged with aiding and abetting, counselling and procuring Carlton Cushnie and Frederick Clough to commit Fraudulent Trading.  An investigation revealed that phony transactions made up more than 80% of Versailles Group plc's turnover in each year from 1992 to the end of 1999 and that Cushnie had profited £29m by selling his shares in Versailles prior to its insolvency.

References
The Guardian: Fall from grace of Labour favourite whose fortune was built on fraud
The Independent: Versailles chiefs charged with fraud over £600m collapse
Serious Fraud Office: Versailles Group plc – 3 charged

Financial services companies established in 1990
Defunct companies based in London
Financial services companies based in London
Companies formerly listed on the London Stock Exchange
Companies formerly listed on the Alternative Investment Market